Joshua Hardcastle (born 28 August 1992) is a professional rugby league footballer who plays as a  or on the  for Featherstone Rovers in the Betfred Championship.

Background
Hardcastle was born in Featherstone, West Yorkshire, England.

Career
Hardcastle was in the Wakefield Trinity Wildcats junior system and played in the Challenge Cup for the Featherstone Lions.

He has also played in Australia for the Whitsunday Brahmans in an amateur Queensland competition.

Hardcastle played for Featherstone in their 2021 Million Pound Game loss against Toulouse Olympique.

References

External links
Featherstone Rovers profile

1992 births
Living people
Featherstone Rovers players
Rugby league centres
Rugby league players from Featherstone